Sahiba Afzal is a Pakistani actress and producer. She is the daughter of Nisho and Tasleem Fazli. She appeared in movies Hero (1992), Hathi Meray Sathi (1993), Munda Bigra Jaey (1995), Chor Machaye Shor (1996), Lur Da Sheitan (1996), Yawa Gunah Bala Sahi (1996), Ham To Chalay Susral (1996) and Munafiq (2013).

Early life
She was born Madiha, daughter of actress Nisho.

Career
Sahiba started her career as leading actress but ended in supporting roles. Her debut film was a "Mohabbat k Sodager", released in 1992. Sahiba's 1st Superhit film was Hero in 1992 with Jan Rambo and Izhar Qazi. Sahiba noted films include Hero (1992), Hathi Mere Sathi (1993), Khazana (1995), Munda Bigra Jaye (1995), Mamla Garbar Hai (1996), Hum To Chalay Susral (1996), Chor Machaye Shor (1996), Dil Bhi Tera Hum Bhi Tere (1997), Zever (1998). She worked in both Urdu and Punjabi movies. She acted in many films in the 1990s but then she took a break after marrying fellow actor John Rambo (Afzal Khan). But after that she appeared in few dramas with her husband.

Personal life
Sahiba married fellow actor Jan Rambo (Afzal Khan) and took some break from the industry and she has two sons.

Filmography

Television series

Telefilm

Film

Awards and recognition

References

External links
 
 http://www.pakmdb.com/movies.php?lang=A&q=Sahiba&Submit=Submit, List of Films starring Sahiba, Retrieved 28 December 2015
 

1976 births
Living people
Pakistani film actresses
Punjabi people
Actresses in Punjabi cinema
Pakistani producers
Actresses from Lahore
20th-century Pakistani actresses
Actresses in Pashto cinema
Punjabi women
Pakistani television actresses
Nigar Award winners
21st-century Pakistani actresses
Pakistani television producers
Actresses in Urdu cinema